Acartauchenius bedeli is a species of sheet weaver found in Algeria. It was described by Simon in 1884.

References

Linyphiidae
Spiders described in 1884
Spiders of North Africa